The Britannia Guyots  (also known as Britannia Bank, Britannia Tablemount, Britannia Tablemounts, Brittania Guyots or Brittania Tablemounts) are a line of extinct volcanic seamounts in the Tasmantid Seamount Chain.

The sediments deposited on top of the alkali olivine basalt originate from the early Middle Miocene when the ocean water was tropical to subtropical. They were described as seamounts in 1961.

The waters above it are incorporated in the Central Eastern Marine Park, an Australian marine park.

References

Seamounts of the Tasman Sea
Guyots
Hotspot volcanoes
Polygenetic volcanoes
Miocene volcanoes
Volcanoes of the Tasman Sea